Dhaku is a former Village development committee in Achham District in the Seti Zone of western Nepal. At the time of the 1991 Nepal census, the village had a population of 1552 living in 292 houses. At the time of the 2001 Nepal census, the population was 1687, of which 33% was literate. Dhaku now is part of Kamalbazar Municipality which was established in 2014.

References

Populated places in Achham District
Village development committees in Achham District